Americold Realty Trust, Inc. is an American temperature-controlled warehousing and transportation company based in Atlanta, Georgia, United States. It is in the business of modern commercialized temperature-controlled warehousing for the storage of perishable goods, one of the forms of food preservation.

History 
When food preservation using ice became commercialized, cold storage companies began to appear.  Ice was farmed from lakes during the winter, and stored, surrounded by straw to insulate it, so that it could be used well into early summer. Ice houses and ice warehouses began to appear and sold blocks of ice for domestic and commercial use. Then in 1922, Clarence Birdseye founded the modern frozen food industry, by pioneering fast freezing (now called blast freezing), based on learning the benefits of low temperature freezing of fish practiced by the Inuit in Arctic regions.

Americold's history began in the early 20th century, around the time of the first ice and coal companies.  Americold came from mergers and acquisitions involving Atlanta Ice and Coal Company, Atlanta City Brewing Company (later known as Atlanta Brewing and Ice Company,) Versacold, Munford, Jackson Atlantic, United Refrigerated Services, Atlas Cold Storage, and others.

In 1903, entrepreneur Ernest Woodruff merged three cold storage warehouses to form Atlanta Ice and Coal Company and in 1909 renamed the company Atlantic Ice and Coal as part of a large consolidation of ice and coal companies throughout the eastern states.  In 1919, Woodruff bought  the Coca-Cola Company from Asa Candler’s children for $25,000,000. 

In 1935, Atlantic Ice & Coal Company changed names to Atlantic Company and began to expand into a variety of different businesses, including cold storage and beer production, the latter contributing up to 50% of the company's revenues at its peak.

Atlantic Company diversified into ice convenience store development under the name EZ stores, before household refrigerators were commonplace. It also ran a fast food operation called Wishbone Fried Chicken.

Atlantic Company merged with Munford Do it Yourself stores and became Atlantic-Munford, rapidly developing its convenience store growth.

The company then merged with Jackson Minit Market and Handy Andy, and was renamed Jackson Atlantic, growing to 40 warehouses in the USA. It was one of the largest warehouse networks at that time.  The company went public in 1968 and a few years later merged with United Refrigerated Services. The company then set out to develop the USA's most comprehensive cold storage network.

Atlanta became the company's home again in the early 1980s.

Acquisitions and mergers continued during the 1980s and 1990s with the company's current name, Americold, appearing in 1997.

In 2010, Americold acquired Versacold to become the largest temperature-controlled warehousing and distribution services provider in the world.

in 2020, Americold acquired Agromerchants the fourth largest temperature-controlled warehousing in the world.

Services
Americold provides temperature-controlled warehousing along with consolidation and multi-vendor consolidation transportation programs. Value added services complement typical warehousing and distribution services and include blast freezing, pick n pack, labeling/relabeling, repacking, kitting, staging, cross-dock, sloughing/tempering, plus light assembly and food processing services. Americold owns and operates over 245 temperature-controlled warehouses, with more than 1 billion cubic feet of storage, in the United States, Australia, New Zealand, China, Argentina, and Canada. Americold's warehouses are a part of the supply chain connecting food producers, processors, distributors, and retailers to consumers.

Organization
Americold has more than 245 locations worldwide.

Americold owns and operates a quarry in Carthage Underground both for the stone excavated and using the caverns and refrigerated storage chambers.

See also 
 Americold Realty Trust v. ConAgra Foods, Inc.

References

External links

i-3PL

Companies with year of establishment missing
Companies listed on the New York Stock Exchange
Transportation companies of the United States
Companies based in Atlanta
Warehouses in the United States
Transportation companies based in Georgia (U.S. state)